Chamaeleo necasi, also known as Necas's chameleon, is a species of chameleon found in Togo and Benin.

References

Chamaeleo
Reptiles of West Africa
Fauna of Benin
Fauna of Togo
Reptiles described in 2007
Taxa named by Wolfgang Böhme (herpetologist)